Goal of the Month may refer to:

 A-League Goal of the Month, as decided by the A-League
 BBC Goal of the Month, as decided by the BBC's Match of the Day programme
 Goal of the Month (Germany), as decided by ARD's Sportschau programme
 Premier League Goal of the Month, as decided by the Premier League

See also

 Goal of the century, several goals in several sports
 Goal of the Decade
 Goal of the Season (disambiguation)
 Goal of the Year (disambiguation)